Alastair or Alistair Taylor may refer to:

Alastair Taylor (footballer) (born 1991), English soccer player
Alastair M. Taylor (1915–2005), Canadian historian, filmmaker and UN official
Alistair Taylor (1935–2004), English personal assistant of Brian Epstein, the manager of the Beatles
Scotch Taylor (Alistair Innes Taylor, 1925–2004), South African cricketer

See also
Alistair, a list of given names Alistair and Alastair
James Alastair Taylor (born 1951), Sheriff Principal of the Sheriffdom of Glasgow and Strathkelvin